John Seymour (died 1501) was a Canon of Windsor from 1471 to 1501

Career

He was educated at All Souls' College, Oxford.

He was appointed:
Proctor of Oxford
Rector of St James’ Church, Garlickhythe 1473 - 1488
Prebendary of Yetminster Secunda in Salisbury 1476

He was appointed to the third stall in St George's Chapel, Windsor Castle in 1471 and held the canonry until 1501.

Notes 

1501 deaths
Canons of Windsor
Alumni of All Souls College, Oxford
Year of birth unknown